Brennan McElroy (born May 12, 1992) is an American former professional basketball player who last played for Tokyo Hachioji Trains in Japan. Currently engaged to Paige Roytek.

References

External links
Indianapolis Greyhounds bio

1992 births
Living people
American expatriate basketball people in Germany
American expatriate basketball people in Japan
American men's basketball players
Basketball players from Illinois
Indianapolis Greyhounds men's basketball players
Power forwards (basketball)
Sportspeople from Decatur, Illinois
Tokyo Cinq Rêves players
Tokyo Hachioji Bee Trains players